Thomas Rhodes may refer to:

 Thomas William Rhodes (1860–1944), New Zealand politician
 Thomas L. Rhodes, American political editor
 Thomas Rhodes (cricketer) (1874–1936), English cricketer
 Tom Rhodes (born 1967), American comedian
 Thomas Rhodes (MP) for Hastings